Glenea alboscutellaris is a species of beetle in the family Cerambycidae. It was described by Stephan von Breuning in 1958. It is known from Thailand.

References

alboscutellaris
Beetles described in 1958